Ilze Juhansone (born 1971) is the Secretary-General of the European Commission. She is a European civil servant and former Latvian diplomat.

In August 2019, she became the acting Secretary-General pending the search for a full-time successor to Germany's Martin Selmayr. Following the period as acting, she was appointed Secretary-General on 14 January 2020. She was previously Deputy Secretary-General of the commission for interinstitutional and external relations from 2015 until 2019, since October 2015, and before that had been Permanent Representative of Latvia to the European Union from 2011 to 2015 during its Council Presidency. This was preceded by having been Director General for EU Affairs at the Latvian Foreign Ministry between 2008 and 2011.

While Permanent Representative of Latvia, she was awarded the Order of the Three Stars, 3rd class.

References

1971 births
Latvian women diplomats
Living people
European civil servants
University of Latvia alumni